Ramsan (also Romanized as Ramsān) is a village in Howmeh-ye Sharqi Rural District, in the Central District of Khorramshahr County, Khuzestan Province, Iran. At the 2006 census, its population was 199, in 46 families.

References 

Populated places in Khorramshahr County